Ami Saito (齋藤 愛美, Saitō Ami, born 26 August 1999) is a Japanese athlete. She competed in the women's 4 × 100 metres relay event at the 2020 Summer Olympics.

References

External links
 

1999 births
Living people
Japanese female sprinters
Athletes (track and field) at the 2020 Summer Olympics
Olympic athletes of Japan
Sportspeople from Okayama Prefecture
20th-century Japanese women
21st-century Japanese women